Zwiebel may refer to:

 Alfred Zwiebel
 Jeffrey Zwiebel
 T. Herman Zwiebel

See also
 Zweibel
 Zwiebel, pseudonym of German author Heinrich Hoffmann (author)
 Zwiebel-Look, "onion[-layer]" clothing style of Jil Sander 

German-language surnames